Lewis Mervyn Charles-Edwards (called Mervyn; 6 April 190220 October 1983) was an Anglican bishop in the third quarter of the 20th century.

Born on 6 April 1902, he was educated at Shrewsbury and Keble College, Oxford. After this he studied for ordination at Lichfield Theological College followed by a curacy at Christ Church, Tunstall. He was made deacon on Trinity Sunday (7 June) 1925 and ordained priest on 19 September 1926 — both times by John Kempthorne, Bishop of Lichfield, at Lichfield Cathedral. He then held incumbencies at Marchington and Market Drayton before becoming rural dean of Hodnet then Newark. An Honorary Chaplain to the King, he was Vicar of St Martin-in-the-Fields, London until his elevation to the episcopate in 1956, where he served for 14 years.

He became Bishop of Worcester when his election was confirmed on 2 January (at St Mary-le-Bow) and he was consecrated a bishop on 6 January 1956, by Geoffrey Fisher, Archbishop of Canterbury, at St Paul's Cathedral. A sub-prelate of the Order of St John of Jerusalem he died on 20 October 1983. Mervyn fathered two children, David and Jill.

Notes

1902 births
1983 deaths
20th-century Church of England bishops
Alumni of Keble College, Oxford
Alumni of Lichfield Theological College
Bishops of Worcester
Honorary Chaplains to the King
People educated at Shrewsbury School
Sub-Prelates of the Venerable Order of Saint John